The Kyber Pakhtunkhwa Judicial Academy is an institution of higher learning in Peshawar, Pakistan which focuses on legal and judicial studies. Its mission is "to change the attitude of young law graduates as judges and to inculcate in them patience, sobriety, confidence, discipline and skill of high quality legal reasoning; to develop their capacity; to enable them to create harmony among all justice sector institutions; to sensitize them to the rights of all litigant public, notably, of the vulnerable communities; and to make them leaders to contribute to the rule of law.

Founding

The academy was founded in March 2011 by the Chief Justice of Peshawar High Court, Justice Dost Muhammad Khan, after consultation with former director general (Hayat Ali Shah) and former dean of the faculty (Dr. Khursheed Iqbal). The governor of Khyber Pakhtunkhwa established the academy with an ordinance issued on 28 December 2011. On 17 January 2012, the Khyber Pakhtunkhwa Assembly passed the Khyber Pakhtunkhwa Judicial Academy Act. The academy was inaugurated on 18 July 2012 by its chairman, Justice Khan.

Board of Governors

The academy is governed by a board of governors, which includes the chief justice of the Peshawar High Court as chairman, the court's senior puisne judge as vice-chairman. Members include the additional chief secretary of the provincial government, the finance secretary, the secretary of law, human rights and parliamentary affairs, the provincial advocate general, the Peshawar High Court registrar, the PHC Member Inspection Team, the PHC additional registrar, the principal/Dean, Faculty of  Law University of Peshawar and the director-general as Member-cum-secretary.

Training

The academy has conducted more than 100 training sessions for members of the provincial judicial system, including judges, attorneys, probation officers, police, and Federally Administered Tribal Areas administrators. Training of trainers was also conducted after a training-needs-assessment survey. The academy has conducted training in substantive and procedural law, judgment writing, case and court management, mediation, human rights, the right to information, and building judicial capacity of political administration in the FATA. Training reports are available on the academy website.
 The academy has hosted more than 30 workshops and seminars on contemporary provincial issues in partnership with international and national humanitarian bodies such as the UNDP, the World Bank, UNICEF, GIZ, SACH, DOST, Foundation da Khwaindo Kor, RSIL & International Committee of Red Cross (ICRC), Justice System Support Program (JSSP).

Postgraduate institute

The Judicial Academy was granted degree-awarding status by the Higher Education Commission. In early 2014, degree courses in legal studies and research (including LL.M. and Ph.D.) were planned.

Research wing

The academy is equipped with Research wing supported by the UNDP which has so far produced reports on two research projects.
The academy conducted the following three studies with the support of the donors organizations; 
Gaps between formal and informal justice systems in Malakand,Civil cases culminating to criminal cases—a baseline study in trends in crimes in Swat and Dir Upper districts, and Efficacy of judicial system in Malakand.

Radio Meezan

Radio Meezan is one of Pakistan's first legal-awareness radio stations, broadcasting programs on legal awareness, human rights and children's and women's rights. Its purpose is to provide information, education, awareness, sensitization, advice, drama, public-service announcements and special programming on national and international days.
The station's policy is to maintain high standards of accuracy, objectivity, balance, simplicity and decency in its broadcasts, focusing on issues related to law and justice in society. Radio Meezan encourages contributions from all, from public officials and lawyers to ordinary citizens.

Mediation Center

The academy established a mediation center, the first of its kind in the country, to resolve disputes using alternative methods. The center is supported by the United Nations Development Programme.

Information Technology

The academy is equipped with information-technology tools and strategies to enhance their participants' learning experience. The ICT department developed and maintains the following:
 Academy and Radio Meezan websites
 Online evaluation forms, using Google for Education
 Management of Google apps, the network, work stations and firewalls
 Payroll, library-information, assets-tracking, bio-metric-attendance, file-tracking and training-information-management systems
 Smart Interactive Boards
 Video Conferencing via PolyCom and Zoom.
 Management of CCTV System

Academic Links

The academy signed memoranda of understanding with the Punjab Judicial Academy, Sindh Judicial Academy, Balochistan Judicial Academy, National Institute of Management, Lahore, Shari'a academy, International Islamic University, Islamabad, University of Malakand, Hazara University and Abdul Wali Khan University Mardan to share best practices and support each other academically, particularly in legal education. The Institute of Management Sciences in Peshawar is also working with the academy to develop curricula and assess training needs.

Director General
Currently the KP judicial academy is headed by Director General, Mr. Zia- ud- din Khattak, {District & Sessions Judge (Retired)}, who took charge on March 20, 2020. The list of former Directors General
 Mr. Fazal Subhan (District & Sessions Judge),October 9, 2018 to March 20, 2019.
 Dr. Khurshid Iqbal (District and Session Judge), December 27, 2017 to  October 8, 2018.
 Khawaja Wajihuddin (District and Session Judge, Additional Charge), November 11, 2017 to December 27, 2017.
 Mr. Muhammad Masood Khan (District & Sessions Judge), January 12, 2017 to November 20, 2017.
 Zia- ud- din Khattak, {District & Sessions Judge (Retired)}, May 2, 2015 to January 09, 2017.
 Hayat Ali Shah, one of the founding father of the academy, who developed the academy into its current form, worked as Director General from February 1, 2012,  until March 31, 2015.

Dean Faculty
Dr. Shakeel Azam Awan is the current Dean Faculty.

The list of former Deans:

 Mr. Sohail Sheraz Noor Sani (District & Sessions Judge)
 Syed Anees Badshah Bukhari (District & Sessions Judge)
 Khawaja Wajihuddin (District & Sessions Judge)
 Dr. Khursheed Iqbal (District & Sessions Judge)

See also 
 Federal Judicial Academy
 Punjab Judicial Academy
 Balochistan Judicial Academy
 Sindh Judicial Academy
 Gilgit-Baltistan Judicial Academy

References

External links
 KPJA Official Website
 Federal Judicial Academy, Islamabad
 Punjab Judicial Academy, Lahore
 Sind Judicial Academy, Karachi
 
 
 
 
 
 
 
 
 
 
 
 https://archive.today/20141202034626/http://www.pakistandespatch.com/hec-issues-noc-kp-judicial-academy-degree-award-status/
 
 
 Rules drafted for speedy disposal of criminal cases March 28, 2018 Dawn

Educational institutions established in 2011
Universities and colleges in Peshawar District
2011 establishments in Pakistan
Legal organizations based in Pakistan